Pure Instinct is the thirteenth studio album by the German hard rock band Scorpions, released in 1996. Reviewers criticized the album for having too many ballads and not enough hard rock or even rock.

The cover art for this album, as with several earlier Scorpions albums, was replaced with an alternative cover for some releases due to the nudity on the original cover. This is the only Scorpions album on which session musician Curt Cress plays drums. The album has more ballads than non-ballads. The song "You and I" gained some popularity and was often played in Scorpions concerts.

Track listing

Personnel
Scorpions
Klaus Meine – lead vocals
Rudolf Schenker – rhythm guitar, backing vocals
Matthias Jabs – lead guitar, backing vocals
Ralph Rieckermann – bass, backing vocals

Session musician
Curt Cress – drums, percussion

Additional musicians
Pitti Hecht – percussion
Luke Herzog, Koen van Bael – keyboards

Production
Erwin Musper – producer, engineer, mixing
Keith Olsen – producer of tracks 1
Evelien Tjebbes, Attie Bauw, Peter Kirkman – assistant engineers
David Foster – Producer, Arranger, Keyboards of tracks 7 (uncredit on this album, but single is credited)
Claude Gaudette – Keyboards of tracks 7 (uncredit on this album, but single is credited)
David Reitzas, Felipe Elgueta – engineer of tracks 7  (uncredit on this album, but single is credited)
Chris Lord-Alge – mixing of tracks 7  (uncredit on this album, but single is credited)
George Marino – mastering at Sterling Sound, New York

Charts

Album

Singles

Year-end charts

Certifications

References

External links
 Official album page
 "You and I" video
 "When You Came into My Life" video

1996 albums
Scorpions (band) albums
Atlantic Records albums
East West Records albums